Gilda Giuliani (born 19 June 1954) is an Italian singer, mainly successful in the 1970s.

Life and career 
Born in Termoli, Campobasso, after some experiences as a chorist in 1972 Giuliani won "Due voci per Sanremo", a contest organized by TV Sorrisi e Canzoni which got her the chance to compete at the 23rd edition of the Sanremo Music Festival. Her song "Serena" was a hit and launched her career, with her vocal style being compared to Mireille Mathieu's and receiving large critical acclaim.

In December the same year, she also competed at the World Popular Song Festival in Tokyo, winning both the Grand Prix and the Most Outstanding Performance Award with the song "Parigi a Volte Cosa Fa".  From the mid-1970s she slowed her activities, focusing her career on international appearances.

After a period of silence, in the 1990s Giuliani was a regular in the RAI musical programs hosted by Paolo Limiti.

Discography
Album

     1973 - Gilda Giuliani
     1974 - Oggi un anno
     1974 - Si ricomincia
     1974 - Chanson pour toi
     1975 - Senza titolo
     1976 - È questione di pelle
     1976 - Tempo di felicità
     1976 - Donna
     1983 - Portami con te (Q-disc)
     1996 - Serena
     2000 - Canzoni d'amore
     2005 - Dominò
     2010 - Canto Mimì

References

External links

1954 births
People from the Province of Campobasso
Italian pop singers
Italian women singers
Living people